The doubles champions of the first U.S. championships were Clarence Clark and Frederick Winslow Taylor.

Draw 
The draw is for the most part unknown. It seems to have consisted of four rounds. In the first round, Clark and Taylor defeated Smith and Crawford Nightingale. In a second match, Alexander Van Rensselaer and Arthur Newbold (né Arthur Emlen Newbold; 1859–1920) beat Arthur Rives and Stevens 6–5 and 6–2. Like in the singles competition, except for the final, each match was played on the best of three sets.

References 
 

Men's Doubles
U.S. National Championships (tennis) by year – Men's doubles